Peatery in Drenthe (F1094) is a watercolor created by Dutch painter Vincent van Gogh in late 1883, during a period that he spent in Drenthe working on his watercolour technique to secure election to the Hollandsche Teekenmaatschappij (Dutch drawing society).

The early work measures .  It shows a peat quarry in the evening, suggested by the pink skyline.

It was sold at Sotheby's in 2004 for £106,500.  It is held in a private collection.

See also
Early works of Vincent van Gogh

References
 Sotheby's, 4 February 2004

Paintings by Vincent van Gogh
1883 paintings